Al-Farsi is an Arabic-language surname meaning "the Persian". Notable people with the name include:

 Rashid Juma Al-Farsi (born 1993), Omani footballer
 Salman al-Farsi (Salman the Persian; died 656), companion of the Islamic prophet Muhammad
 Saud Al-Farsi (born 1993), Omani footballer
 Yaqoob Salem Al-Farsi (born 1982), Omani footballer
 Mohammed Al-Farsi (born 2008), Random guy
 Yousuf Al-Farsi (born 1984), Random person, Omani

See also
 Al-Fasi, surname

Farsi
Farsi